Drottning Silvias Pokal (literally: Queen Silvia's Trophy) is an annual international Group One harness event for trotters. It is held at Åby Racetrack in Mölndal, 10 km south of Gothenburg, Sweden. It is a stakes race for 4-year-old mares. The purse in the 2009 final was ≈US$273,000 (€200,000), of which the winner Mystic Lady U.S. won half.

Racing conditions
Drottning Silvia's Pokal has since the start in 1983 been raced over 2,140 meters (1.33 mile). Auto start (motorized gate) has been used every year, with the exception of 1988, when the race was started using volt start.

The final of the event is preceded by a number of elimination races, taking place approximately ten days before the final. Through the years, the number of elimination heats has been between two and six.

The 2009 Drottning Silvias Pokal 
The four elimination heats of the 2009 event took place on April 30, 14 days before the final. Winners of these heats were Annicka, Mystical Ann, Mystic Lady U.S. and Vanessa du Ling. In the final Mystical Ann, Annicka and Vanessa du Ling was first, second and third betting favourites, respectively. Qualification winner Mystic Lady U.S. was one of the outsiders.

The starting list 
 Mystical Ann - Åke Svanstedt
 Annicka - Jörgen Westholm
 Vanessa du Ling - Johnny Takter (Timo Nurmos)
 Mystic Lady U.S. - Robert Bergh (Åke Svanstedt)
 Miss Sixty - Olle Goop
 Lily Kronos - Lutfi Kolgjini
 Queen of Rock - Torbjörn Jansson (Jörgen Axén)
 Victoria Island - Thomas Uhrberg (Lutfi Kolgjini)
 Caddie Dream - Erik Adielsson (Stig H. Johansson)
 Calamara Donna - Örjan Kihlström (Roger Walmann)
 Tiffany Brodda - Per Lennartsson (Stig H. Johansson)
 Looking Flashy - Peter Untersteiner

(Trainer, if other than driver, in parentheses)

The race 
Mystical Ann was able to keep the lead in the start. Third favourite Vanessa du Ling broke stride almost instantly and could not repair the damage. When Annicka attacked with 1,200 meters to go, leading driver Åke Svanstedt handed over the front position to Annicka and Jörgen Westholm. Behind Mystical Ann, as third on the rail, was Mystic Lady U.S, followed by Calamara Donna and Tiffany Brodda. On the outside, Lily Kronos relieved Miss Sixty as parker with one lap (1,000 meters) to go. Queen of Rock raced in third over, with Caddie Dream behind. The latter attacked in the final lap, and eventually finished fourth. Down the stretch, the front runners appeared to be tired and, using the double open stretch, Mystic Lady U.S. and Calamara Donna could claim first and second place. Third was Tiffany Brodda, who also finished fast on the inside. Favourite Mystical Ann came in fifth.

The American-born filly Mystic Lady U.S., who was sired by Andover Hall and out of Astraea Hanover, is trained by Åke Svanstedt. Mystic Lady U.S. won by a neck in 1:58.3f (mile rate)/1:13.7 (km rate). She is the biggest outsider to win in the history of the event.

Past winners

Drivers with most wins
 5 - Johnny Takter
 3 - Olle Goop
 3 - Örjan Kihlström
 2 - Erik Adielsson
 2 - Robert Bergh
 2 - Stig H. Johansson
 2 - Bo Näslund
 2 - Åke Svanstedt

Trainers with most wins
 3 - Petri Puro
 3 - Åke Svanstedt
 3 - Olle Goop
 3 - Stig H. Johansson
 2 - Björn Larsson
 2 - Bo Näslund
 2 - Roger Walmann

Sires with at least two winning offsprings
 3 - Quick Pay (Kristina Palema, Lass Dame, Sacrifice)
 2 - Pine Chip (Rae Boko, Lotuschic)

Winner with lowest odds
 Winning odds: 1.18 - Ina Scot (1993)

Winner with highest odds
 Winning odds: 32.63 - Mystic Lady U.S. (2009)

Fastest winners

Auto start
 1:12.4 (km rate) - Gisela Ås (2013)

Volt start
 1:17.0 (km rate) - Gina Roy (1988)

All winners of Drottning Silvias Pokal

See also
 List of Scandinavian harness horse races

References

Harness races in Sweden